Foo Dog or Fu Dog usually refers to Chinese guardian lions (石獅; Shíshī), traditional Chinese architectural ornament known in colloquial English as foo dogs or lion dogs.

It may also refer to:
 Fu Dog (American Dragon: Jake Long), a character in the animated series American Dragon: Jake Long
 Lion dog (disambiguation)

See also 
 Fufu (dog), the pet poodle of Maha Vajiralongkorn, then Crown Prince of Thailand
 Foo (disambiguation)
 Foo-foo (disambiguation)
 Fu (disambiguation)